Bury Tomorrow is a British metalcore band from Southampton, Hampshire, England. They have released six studio albums and two extended plays.

Albums

Studio albums

Extended plays

Singles

Music videos

References

Heavy metal group discographies
Discographies of British artists